Biju Sopanam (born 4 January  1970) is an Indian television, theatre, and film actor. He is best known for portraying the character of Balachandran Thampi in the popular sitcom Uppum Mulakum, broadcast on Flowers TV. He made his movie debut by acting in a small role in the hit movie Rajamanikyam in the year 2005. He is a renowned Sanskrit Drama Artist and have performed in many stages across the country. He was trained under Kavalam Narayana Panicker, the iconic Indian dramatist.

Early life
He was born in Neyyattinkara, Thiruvananthapuram. His younger brother, Binoj Kulathoor, is also a television artist.

Career 
He started his career as a theatre artist at the age of 20 in Kavalam Narayana Panicker's Sopanam Theatre Group. Along with the group he travelled across India participating in National Theatre Festival(Bharat Rang Mahotsav) and other prestigious programmes. He wanted to get into movies through this but he later revealed that after joining the group he become totally focused on drama and subsequently he left his dreams of becoming a film actor. From 2005 to 2013 he acted in three different films portraying short roles. Then in 2015 he was cast as Benjamin Brunou, a college principal in the television series Back Benchers, being telecasted in Amrita TV. On seeing him in this programme he was called up by director R.Unnikrishnan for his upcoming sitcom being made for Flowers TV. This programme is considered as his breakthrough. He was cast as Balachandran Thampi, a carefree, loving father and husband in the sitcom which was named as Uppum Mulakum. As he had to spend more time on the sets of Uppum Mulakum, his guru Kavalam Narayana Panicker asked him to stop it. But after being impressed by his work in it, he was allowed to do it, but in return he was asked to never leave theatre, which he agreed and now leads the group after his guru's death in 2016, trying to work there through his busy schedule. He skyrocketed to fame for his work in the programme drawing praise from various media organisations. Then he was called for a supporting role as Advocate Subbu in C/O Saira Banu.

Filmography

Television

Awards

References

External links

Male actors in Malayalam cinema
Living people
21st-century Indian male actors
Indian male film actors
Indian male television actors
1970 births
Neyyattinkara
Male actors from Thiruvananthapuram